CCGS Ernest Lapointe was a Canadian Coast Guard light icebreaker that served for 37 years. Completed in 1941, Ernest Lapointe was taken out of service in 1978. The ship was active along the East Coast of Canada and in the Saint Lawrence River. In 1980, the vessel was turned into a museum ship in Quebec.

Description
The vessel was powered by a compound steam reciprocating engine driving two shafts creating . The ship was initially designed to be powered by triple-expansion steam engines. However, during the Second World War, the ship bringing the engines to Canada was sunk in transit. In order to complete the ship, compound engines from tugboats were installed. The ship had two four-cylinder compound engines, each having two high-pressure and two low-pressure cylinders.

Service history
Ernest Lapointe was ordered from Davie Shipbuilding in 1939 and constructed at their yard in Lauzon, Quebec with the yard number 514. The vessel was launched on 25 November 1939, though construction was delayed due to priority given to the corvettes being built at the yard. The ship was completed in February 1941. The vessel was named for a former Minister of Marine and Fisheries, Ernest Lapointe. Entering service during the Second World War, Ernest Lapointe was used to resupply the base at Goose Bay, Newfoundland. The icebreaker also aided  in the Saint Lawrence River.

Following the war, Ernest Lapointe was used primarily in the Saint Lawrence River as an icebreaker and survey vessel. Beginning in 1955 the ship was used for ceremonial occasions. In 1958 Ernest Lapointe carried a delegation to Godthaab, Greenland, and in 1964 was used to re-enact the arrival the Fathers of Confederation into Charlottetown, Prince Edward Island. The ship was taken out of service in 1978 and put up for disposal. In 1980 the vessel was acquired by the Maritime Museum of Quebec for use as a museum ship. The icebreaker was placed in a gravel-filled dock in L'Islet, Quebec.

Notes

Citations

Sources

External links
 The icebreaker CCGS Ernest Lapointe at Maritime Museum of Quebec

Navaids tenders of the Canadian Coast Guard
1939 ships
Museum ships in Canada
Ships built in Quebec
Museum ships in Quebec